hash is a command on Unix and Unix-like operating systems that prints the location information for the commands found. The  command has also been ported to the IBM i operating system.

Syntax
 $ hash [name]

Description
When the user gives a command, the shell searches for the command in the path specified in the PATH environmental variable and stores the location in the hash. This command can be used to search for the command given. The command is built into the shell. C shell implements this command in a different way.

Options
The following options are supported.
 
name Searches the PATH environmental variable for the name given

Exit Status
This command returns the following exit values:

0 Successful  completion 

1 An Error occurred

Examples
 $ hash

Print the hash table.

 $ hash cat

Searches for command cat in the path specified by PATH environmental variable; if found, adds it to the hash.

See also
 find
 Unix shell

References

External links

 
 

Unix SUS2008 utilities
IBM i Qshell commands